Cinemateca Argentina is a film archive located in Buenos Aires, Argentina. It was established in 1949. It holds more than 22,000 films, 80,000 photographs and a library.

See also 
 List of film archives
 Cinema of Argentina

References

External links 
 https://web.archive.org/web/20151108080935/http://www.cinematecaargentina.org.ar/

Film archives in South America